Kutukovo is a rural locality (a selo) in Novoalexandrovskoye Rural Settlement, Suzdalsky District, Vladimir Oblast, Russia. The population was 607 as of 2010. There are 12 streets.

Geography 
Kutukovo is located 29 km southwest of Suzdal (the district's administrative centre) by road. Novaya Derevnya is the nearest rural locality.

References 

Rural localities in Suzdalsky District